This article lists political parties in Kosovo.
Kosovo has a multi-party system with numerous political parties, in which no one party often has a chance of gaining power alone, and parties must work with each other to form coalition governments.

Major parties

Having seats in Parliament of Kosovo as a result of 2021 general election and subsequent shifts:

Minor parties
 Democratic Alternative of Kosovo (Alternativa Demokratike e Kosovës)
 Albanian Christian Democratic Party of Kosovo (Partia Shqiptare Demokristiane e Kosovës)
 Green Party of Kosovo (Partia e të Gjelbërve të Kosovës)
 Liberal Party of Kosovo (Partia Liberale e Kosovës)
 Coalition Party (Kosovo)
 Social Democratic Initiative (Kosovo)
 Social Democratic Party of Kosovo
 The Word (Fjala)

Minority parties
Turkish Justice Party of Kosovo (Kosova Türk Adalet Partisi)
Ashkali Party for Integration (Partia e Ashkalinjëve për Integrim)
Bosniak Party of Democratic Action of Kosovo (Bošnjačka Stranka Demokratske Akcije Kosova)
Bosnian League of Kosovo
Civic Initiative of Gora (Građanska Inicijativa Gore)
Civic Initiative National Wing (Gradjanska Inicijativa Krilo Naroda)
Vakat Coalition (Koalicija Vakat)
Democratic Ashkali Party of Kosovo (Partia Demokratike e Ashkanlive të Kosovës)
Kosovo Turkish Union (Kosova Türk Birliǧi)
League of Egyptians of Kosovo (Lidhja e Egjiptianëve të Kosovës)
Montenegrin Democratic Party (Crnogorska Demokratska Stranka)
New Democratic Initiative of Kosovo (Iniciativa e re Demokratike e Kosovës)
 New Democratic Party (Nova Demokratska Stranka)
Party of Democratic Action (Stranka Demokratske Akcije)
Social Democratic Party of Gora (Socijaldemokratska Stranka Gore)
Turkish Democratic Party of Kosovo (Kosova Demokratik Türk Partisi)
United Roma Party of Kosovo (Partia Rome e Bashkuar e Kosovës)
Serb List
Serb Civic Initiative (Građanska Inicijativa Srbija)
Independent Liberal Party (Samostalna Liberalna Stranka)
New Democracy (Nova Demokratija)
Serb Democratic Party of Kosovo and Metohija (Srpska Demokratska Stranka Kosova i Metohije)
Serb Kosovo-Metohija Party (Srpska Kosovsko-Metohijska Stranka)
Serbian List for Kosovo and Metohija (Srpska Lista za Kosovo i Metohiju)
Serb People's Party (Srpska Narodna Stranka)
Serbian Social Democratic Party (Srpska Socijaldemokratska Stranka)
Union of Independent Social Democrats of Kosovo and Metohija (Savez Nezavisnih Socijaldemokrata Kosova i Metohije)
United Serbian List (Jedinstvena Srpska Lista) (all-Serb list, lists 56 candidates of both the ruling and the opposition parties based in Belgrade)
Unique Gorani Party (Jedinstvena Goranska Partija)
 Social Democratic Union (Socijaldemokratska Unija)
 Progressive Movement of Kosovar Roma (Kosovaki Romengi Anglipaski Phiravlin)

Former parties
New Spirit Party (Partia Fryma e Re)
Reformist Party ORA (Partia Reformiste ORA)
People's Movement of Kosovo (Lëvizja Popullore e Kosovës)
Socialist Party of Kosovo (Partia Socialiste e Kosovës)
National Movement for the Liberation of Kosovo (Lëvizja Kombëtare për Çlirimin e Kosovës)
Movement for Integration and Unification (Lëvizja për Integrim dhe Bashkim)
Democratic League of Dardania (Lidhja Demokratike e Dardanisë)
Partia e Fortë (Strong Party)

See also
 Lists of political parties

Notes

References

Kosovo
 
Political parties
Kosovo